The , also called the Seta River (瀬田川 Seta-gawa) and the Uji River (宇治川 Uji-gawa) at portions of its route, is the principal river in Osaka Prefecture on Honshu, Japan. The source of the river is Lake Biwa in Shiga Prefecture to the north.

The Yodo River, usually called the Seta River in Shiga Prefecture, begins at the southern outlet of the lake in Ōtsu. There is a dam there to regulate the lake level. Further downstream, the Seta flows into Kyoto Prefecture and its name changes to the Uji River. It then merges with two other rivers, the Katsura River and the Kizu River in Kyoto Prefecture. The Katsura has its headwaters in the mountains of Kyoto Prefecture, while the Kizu comes from Mie Prefecture. From the three-river confluence, the river is called the Yodo River, which flows south, through Osaka, and on into Osaka Bay. In Osaka, part of the river has been diverted into an artificial channel; the old course in the heart of Osaka is called the Kyū-Yodo River (literally, 'Former Yodo River'). It serves as a source of water for irrigation and also powers hydroelectric generators.

History
The choice of the ancient capital Heian-kyō (now Kyoto) during the Heian period, was partly chosen because of the presence of the Yodo river that flows towards Osaka, and its outlet on the Seto Inland Sea.

The river played a very important role for the movement and transport of goods between Osaka and Kyoto, until the arrival of the first trains in the 1870s. In 1858, it is estimated there were 50 boats daily of all types that carried about 1,500 people from Osaka to Fushimi. In the 19th century, a trip to Steamboat between Osaka and Fushimi could take 12 hours.

There's antique Ukiyo-e that depict the history of Yodo River (Uji River). The Uji River has a prominent place in the so-called "Uji chapters" of The Tale of Genji, a novel written by the Japanese noblewoman Murasaki Shikibu in the early eleventh century.

Nowadays, the Uji River, or the Yodo River in Kyoto Prefecture, is a popular fishing spot during the summer and fall months.

Transportation

There are more than 50 bridges that cross the Yodo river. These include bridges for cars and trains.

References

External links
 (mouth)
 (origin)

Rivers of Osaka Prefecture
Rivers of Kyoto Prefecture
Rivers of Shiga Prefecture
Rivers of Japan